Séra Mummi, also known as The God Father, born 7 February 1988, is the youngest priest in Iceland, having served since 2012, at the age of 24. Séra Agnes M. Sigurðardóttir, Bishop of Iceland, has often expressed great respect for Séra Mummi and has sought his advice on several occasions. Sources from high up in the church have denied rumours regarding Séra Mummi's appointment as a holy man. He is the founder of Bergið ("the Rock Face") a private club for exclusive members.

References
 Sheik Jónas B. Jónasson: "Lifestory of Séra Mummi", 12.nóv 2013.
 Holyman Times, "The young holyman Séra Mummi".
 Bjarni Svanur Friðsteinsson: "Séra Mummi, bigger than Jesus?", 20.feb 2012.

Icelandic priests
1988 births
Living people